Arlette Marchal (29 January 1902 – 11 February 1984) was a French film actress. She appeared in more than 40 films between 1922 and 1951. She was born and died in Paris.

Partial filmography

 Mon p'tit (1922)
 The Gardens of Murcia (1923) - Maria del Carmen
 Sarati le terrible (Sarati the Terrible) (1923) - Hélène
 The Portrait (1923) - Madeleine Fontevrault "das Bildnis"
 La Dame au ruban de velours (1923) - Adrienne
 Un coquin (1923) - Renée de Meillane
 The Bell of Love (La Cabane d'amour) (1923) - Norine Pastoret
 Terror (1924) - Madame Gauthier
 Die Sklavenkönigin (aka Moon of Israel (USA)) (1924) - Userti
 Un Drame au Carlton Club (The Carlton Club Drama) (1924)
 The Last House on the Beach (1924)
 Madame Sans-Gene (1925) - Marie-Caroline, la Reine de Naples
 Venetian Lovers (1925) - Countess Lola Astoni
 Born to the West (1926) - Belle of Paradise Bar
 The Cat's Pajamas (1926) - Riza Dorina
 Diplomacy (1926) - Countess Zicka
 The Lady of Lebanon (1926) - Countess Athelstane Orloff
 Das Bildnis (1926)
 Forlorn River (1926) - Ina Blaine
 Blonde or Brunette (1927) - Blanche
 Wings (1927) - Celeste
 Le manoir de la peur (1927)
 Hula (1927) - Mrs. Bane
 A Gentleman of Paris (1927) - Yvonne Dufour
 The Spotlight (1927) - Maggie Courtney
 The Woman of Yesterday and Tomorrow (1928) - Hilde von Lobach
 The Lady with the Mask (1928) - Doris von Seefeld - seine Tochter
 Figaro (1929) - Rosine
 An Ideal Woman (1929) - Suzanne Fleury
 Boudoir diplomatique (1931)
 Toboggan (1932)
 Don Quixote (1933) - The Duchess
 La Poule (1933) - Guillemette
 The Oil Sharks (1933) - Jeannette
 Le Petit Roi (The Little King) (1933) - La comtesse Slasko
 La femme idéale (1934) - Madeleine
 Toboggan (1934) - Lisa
 L'auberge du Petit-Dragon (1934)
 La Marche nuptiale (1935) - Suzanne Lechatelier
 Entente cordiale (1939) - La reine Alexandra
 La Piste du nord (1939) - Mme. Shaw
 Le journal tombe à cinq heures (1942) - Jeanne Marchal
 Father Serge (1945) - La tsarine
 The Elusive Pimpernel (1950) - Contesses de Tournai
 Without Leaving an Address (1951) - Madame Forestier

Theater
Tovaritch, Paris Theatre (1960)

References

External links

on the cover of PHOTOPLAY Magazine, March 1927(archived)

1902 births
1984 deaths
French film actresses
French silent film actresses
Actresses from Paris
20th-century French actresses